Walter Fernandez (born 20 August 1965) is a retired Swiss football defender.

Honours
Neuchâtel Xamax
Swiss Super Cup: 1990

References

1965 births
Living people
Swiss men's footballers
FC Lausanne-Sport players
Neuchâtel Xamax FCS players
FC Lugano players
Servette FC players
Association football defenders
Swiss Super League players
Switzerland international footballers